Size is an important aspect of dinosaur paleontology, of interest to both the general public and professional scientists.

The latest evidence suggests that dinosaurs' average size varied through the Triassic, early Jurassic, late Jurassic and Cretaceous periods, and dinosaurs probably only became widespread during the early or  mid Jurassic. The mode of Mesozoic dinosaur body masses is between one and ten metric tonnes.

Size estimation
Scientists will probably never be certain of the largest and smallest dinosaurs. This is because only a small fraction of animals ever fossilize, and most of these remains will either never be uncovered, or will be unintentionally destroyed as a result of human activity. Of the specimens that are recovered, few are even relatively complete skeletons, and impressions of skin and other soft tissues are rarely discovered. Rebuilding a complete skeleton by comparing the size and morphology of bones to those of similar, better-known species is an inexact art (though governed by some established allometric trends), and reconstructing the muscles and other organs of the living animal is, at best, a process of educated guesswork, and never perfect. Mass estimates for dinosaurs are much more variable than length estimates given the lack of soft tissue preservation in the fossilization process.  Modern mass estimation is often done with the laser scan skeleton technique that puts a "virtual" skin over the known or implied skeleton, but the limitations inherent in previous mass estimation techniques remain.

Sauropodomorphs

Sauropodomorph size is difficult to estimate given their usually fragmentary state of preservation. Sauropods are often preserved without their tails, so the margin of error in overall length estimates is high. Mass is calculated using the cube of the length, so for species in which the length is particularly uncertain, the weight is even more so. Estimates that are particularly uncertain (due to very fragmentary or lost material) are preceded by a question mark. Each number represents the highest estimate of a given research paper. One large sauropod, Maraapunisaurus fragillimus, was based on particularly scant remains that have been lost since their description by paleontologists in 1878. One later analysis of the surviving evidence, and the biological plausibility of such a large land animal, suggested that the enormous size of this animal was an over-estimate due partly to typographical errors in the original report. This would later be challenged by a different study, which argued Cope's measurements were genuine and there's no basis for assuming typographical errors.

Generally, the giant sauropods can be divided into two categories: the shorter but stockier and more massive forms (mainly titanosaurs and some brachiosaurids), and the longer but slenderer and more light-weight forms (mainly diplodocids).

Because different methods of estimation sometimes give conflicting results, mass estimates for sauropods can vary widely causing disagreement among scientists over the accurate number. For example, the titanosaur Dreadnoughtus was originally estimated to weigh 59.3 tonnes by the allometric scaling of limb-bone proportions, whereas more recent estimates, based on three-dimensional reconstructions, yield a much smaller figure of 22.1–38.2 tonnes.

The sauropods were the longest and heaviest dinosaurs. For much of the dinosaur era, the smallest sauropods were larger than almost anything else in their habitat, and the largest were an order of magnitude more massive than anything else known to have walked the Earth since. Giant prehistoric mammals such as Paraceratherium and Palaeoloxodon (the largest land mammals ever discovered) were dwarfed by the giant sauropods, and only modern whales approach or surpass them in weight, though they live in the oceans. There are several proposed advantages for the large size of sauropods, including protection from predation, reduction of energy use, and longevity, but it may be that the most important advantage was dietary. Large animals are more efficient at digestion than small animals, because food spends more time in their digestive systems. This also permits them to subsist on food with lower nutritive value than smaller animals. Sauropod remains are mostly found in rock formations interpreted as dry or seasonally dry, and the ability to eat large quantities of low-nutrient browse would have been advantageous in such environments.

One of the tallest and heaviest dinosaurs known from good skeletons is Giraffatitan brancai (previously classified as a species of Brachiosaurus). Its remains were discovered in Tanzania between 1907 and 1912. One of the longest complete dinosaurs is the  Diplodocus, which was discovered in Wyoming in the United States and displayed in Pittsburgh's Carnegie Natural History Museum in 1907.

There were larger dinosaurs, but knowledge of them is based entirely on a small number of fragmentary fossils. Some of the longest sauropods were those with exceptionally long, whip-like tails, such as the  Diplodocus hallorum (formerly Seismosaurus) and the  Barosaurus.

In 2014, the fossilized remains of a previously unknown species of sauropod were discovered in Argentina. The specimens found were remarkably complete, significantly more so than previous titanosaurs. It since been suggested that Patagotitan was not necessarily larger than Argentinosaurus and Puertasaurus.

The largest of non-sauropod sauropodomorphs was Euskelosaurus.

Theropods

Tyrannosaurus was for many decades the largest and best-known theropod to the general public. Since its discovery, however, a number of other giant carnivorous dinosaurs have been described, including Spinosaurus, Carcharodontosaurus, and Giganotosaurus. These large theropod dinosaurs are estimated to rival or even exceeded Tyrannosaurus rex in size, though more recent studies and reconstructions show that Tyrannosaurus, although shorter, was the bulkier animal overall. Specimens such as Sue and Scotty are both estimated to be the most massive theropods known to science. There is still no clear explanation for exactly why these animals grew so bulky and heavy compared to the land predators that came before and after them.

However, some studies suggest that Anchiornis was actually an avialan. However, in 2022 its holotype was recognized as a juvenile individual.

This is based on evidence that theropods were the only dinosaurs to get continuously smaller, and that their skeletons changed four times faster than those of most other dinosaur species.

See also

Largest prehistoric animals
Megafauna
Pterosaur size

References

External links
 
 The Biggest Carnivore: Dinosaur History Rewritten
  (Dinosaur size#References)
 "Dinosaur records", Czech article by Vladimír Socha; DinosaurusBlog.com, August 1, 2016

Animal size
Dinosaur paleobiology